Anna Kristina Cervin (27 May 1878 in Holmedal, Sweden – 1972) was a Swedish artist, primarily known for her painting work.

Early life 
Cervin was the daughter of August Cervin and Emma Brattén.

Career and artistic style 
She studied at the Royal Swedish Academy of Arts in Stockholm between 1898 and 1903, at the Académie Colarossi in Paris between 1903 and 1904, and at the Harriet Backer School in Oslo between 1907 and 1908. She worked in Sweden. At first she mainly painted still life portraits and landscape paintings, mostly with oil.

She became known for her skill copying family portraits and older paintings. She was featured in several Swedish artists' exhibitions and in the exhibition Fem målarinnor in Värmlands Museum in 1948, and at Lund University's art exhibition in 1919.

Her works are presented at the Nationalmuseum and in the Värmlands museum in Karlstad, among others.

Personal life 
She was married to the Norwegian sculptor Jens Munthe-Svendsen between 1904 and 1912.

References 
This article is completely or partly based on material from the Swedish Wikipedia, Anna Cervin (from 21 June 2014).
 
 

1878 births
1972 deaths
People from Årjäng Municipality
Swedish artists
Swedish expatriates in France
Swedish expatriates in Norway
Académie Colarossi alumni